Radka Bobková and Petra Langrová were the defending champions but only Bobkova competed that year with Flora Perfetti.

Bobkova and Perfetti lost in the quarterfinals to Florencia Labat and Barbara Rittner.

Janette Husárová and Barbara Schett won in the final 6–1, 6–2 against Labat and Rittner.

Seeds
Champion seeds are indicated in bold text while text in italics indicates the round in which those seeds were eliminated.

 Sandra Cecchini /  Laura Garrone (first round)
 Silke Meier /  Henrieta Nagyová (quarterfinals)
 Radka Bobková /  Flora Perfetti (quarterfinals)
 Corina Morariu /  Sarah Pitkowski (semifinals)

Draw

External links
 1996 Internazionali Femminili di Palermo Doubles Draw

Internazionali Femminili di Palermo
1996 WTA Tour